The Solicitor-General of Victoria, known informally as the Solicitor-General, is the state's Second Law Officer and the deputy of the Attorney-General. The Solicitor-General acts alongside the Crown Advocate and Crown Solicitor, and serves as one of the legal and constitutional advisers of the Crown and its government in the Australian state of Victoria.

The Solicitor-General is addressed in court as "Mr/Ms Solicitor". Despite the title, the position may only be filled by a barrister admitted serving as Senior Counsel, for a period specific by the Governor of Victoria. The inaugural Solicitor-General was Redmond Barry, who serviced from 15 July 1851 to 18 January 1852. The current Solicitor-General is Rowena Orr .

History and function 
Formerly, they were elected members of parliament, but have not been so since the early/mid twentieth century. The functions of the Victorian Solicitor-General are two-fold. First, they act as Victoria's senior legal adviser. Second, they represent the state in significant legal proceedings where Victoria is party, or where the Victorian Attorney-General intervenes either in Commonwealth matters under section 78A of the Judiciary Act 1903 or in matters concerning the Charter of Human Rights and Responsibilities Act 2006 under s 34 of that Act. In 2003, Victoria appointed its first female Solicitor-General, Pamela Tate, following an unprecedented public advertising of the position.

See also

Solicitor-General of Australia
Solicitor General for New South Wales

Notes

References 

Victoria (Australia) law